The Canada Green Building Council (CaGBC) was created in 2003 to further the expansion of green building in Canada. Prior to the formation of the Council, Canada had participated in the United States Green Building Council (USGBC) through British Columbia's membership in the USGBC's Cascadia Chapter.

The CaGBC was founded by Kevin Hydes of Integral Group, Joe Van Belleghem, Jon Hobbs, formerly of the Royal Architectural Institute of Canada and Peter Busby of Perkins+Will Canada. It is a member of the World Green Building Council.

The CaGBC's mission is to lead and accelerate the transformation to high-performing, healthy green buildings, homes and communities throughout Canada. The CaGBC promotes its Zero Carbon Building Standard, and through GBCI Canada, promotes the LEED rating system, Investor Confidence Project and Investor Ready Energy Efficiency certification, TRUE zero waste certification, SITES, and the WELL Building Standard.

The CaGBC Awards recognize individuals and organizations who have made outstanding contributions to Canada's green building industry. These awards include the CaGBC Leadership Awards, the Andy Kesteloo Memorial Student Project Award, and the Green Building Excellence Awards. These awards celebrate innovative sustainable building practices and techniques being made in Canada.

LEED Canada-NC v1.0
The Canadian version of LEED is very similar to the USGBC NC version.  It contains the following categories:
 Sustainable sites (SS)
 Water efficiency (WE)
 Energy and atmosphere (EA)
 Materials & resources (MR)
 Indoor environmental quality (EQ)
 Innovation in design (ID)
 Regional priorities (RP)

LEED Certification in Canada is done solely through the CaGBC. Registration under LEED® Canada rating systems is closed; projects needed to submit for certification by October 31, 2022. New projects must register under LEED v4.

See also

 Natural Resources Canada
 Rainwater harvesting in Canada
 West Coast Environmental Law
 Environmental Dispute Resolution Fund
 R-2000 program
 Sustainable architecture
 United Kingdom Green Building Council
 United States Green Building Council
 World Green Building Council
 Canadian Green Building Awards

References

External links
 Official CaGBC website 
 World Green Building Council

Environmental organizations based in Canada
Green Building Councils
Sustainable building in Canada